Pyongyang: A Journey in North Korea is a black-and-white graphic novel by the Canadian Québécois author Guy Delisle, published in 2004. The novel details the months Delisle spent in Pyongyang while working for a French animation company.

Overview
Pyongyang documents Delisle's experiences in Pyongyang, the capital of North Korea, where he stayed for two months. Acting as the liaison between a French animation producing company (Protécréa working for TF1) and the SEK Studio (Scientific Educational Korea) company, he struggles with the difficulties of outsourcing and the bureaucracy of the totalitarian closed state.

The book has 176 pages, two of them drawn by a French colleague ("Fabrice").

It was drawn in Ethiopia, where Delisle's wife was working for Médecins Sans Frontières.

Delisle does not expect to return to North Korea, writing: "I don't think I would be welcome there anymore."

Summary
Delisle arrives in Pyongyang, bringing, in addition to the items that he was authorized to bring into the country, a copy of George Orwell's Nineteen Eighty-Four, that he judged appropriate for a totalitarian state, CDs of Aphex Twin, and presents like Gitanes cigarettes and Hennessy cognac.

Delisle encounters former colleagues working at SEK Studio on an adaptation of the Corto Maltese comics. He also meets foreign diplomats, NGO workers in the World Food Programme and businessmen, such as French engineers installing an HDTV transmitter.

During his two-month visit, he stays at the Yanggakdo International Hotel, and visits other foreigners in the Koryo Hotel. Accompanied by his guide, he visits the massive statue of Kim Il-sung, the Pyongyang Metro, the legation quarter, the Diplomatic Club (former Romanian embassy), the Arch of Triumph, the Juche Tower, the International Friendship Exhibition, the USS Pueblo, the enormous Ryugyong Hotel, the Taekwondo Hall, the Children's Palace and the Museum of Imperialist Occupation.

Delisle notes things such as tightrope walking, the absence of disabled and elderly people, North Korean music propaganda, the cult of personality for past leader Kim Il-sung and his son Kim Jong-il, the required presence of his translator and guide, nearly-expired water from the South, Coca-Cola and kimjongilias. He also notes the extreme level of apparent brainwashing in the citizens of Pyongyang, perhaps prompted by the oppressive atmosphere of the area. When questioned regarding the lack of disabled people in Pyongyang, his guide asserts and seems to genuinely believe that North Korea has no disabled, and that the children of the "Korean race" are all born healthy, strong and intelligent.

Publication
The English version was translated from the French by Helge Dascher, and published by Canadian publisher Drawn & Quarterly. A new English version with new cover design and introduction by Gore Verbinski has been published.

Cancelled film
New Regency was working on a film version of Pyongyang, with Steve Conrad to write the script and Gore Verbinski to direct the film, and to star Steve Carell, but this was cancelled in December 2014 in the wake of threats made by hackers alleged to be tied to North Korea to movie theaters over the film The Interview, which mocks the North Korean government. The film started pre-production in October 2014, and at the time of cancellation was still without a title. New Regency revealed that the scheduled distributor, Fox, cancelled their participation in the project after the incidents with The Interview.

See also

Burma Chronicles
Jerusalem
Shenzhen

References

External links
 Pyongyang Too, a photographic recreation of the graphic novel by Andy Deemer and Michelle Woo
 Intervalles Shenzhen Pyongyang, exposition on Delisle's work for French-speaking audiences, scenography by Bekir Aysan
 Pyongyang on Guy Delisle's web page

2004 graphic novels
2004 comics debuts
Drawn & Quarterly titles
Books about Pyongyang
Comics set in North Korea
Autobiographical graphic novels
Quebec art
Canadian graphic novels
Comics by Guy Delisle